The listed buildings in Doncaster are included in the following lists, divided by ward:

 Listed buildings in Doncaster (Balby South Ward)
 Listed buildings in Doncaster (Bentley Ward)
 Listed buildings in Doncaster (Bessacarr Ward)
 Listed buildings in Doncaster (Hexthorpe and Balby North Ward)
 Listed buildings in Doncaster (Town Ward)
 Listed buildings in Doncaster (Wheatley Hills and Intake Ward)

Doncaster